Astri is a given name. Notable people with the name include:

 Astri Aas-Hansen (born 1970), Norwegian politician for the Labour Party
 Astri Knudsen Bech, Norwegian handball player
 Astri Rynning (1915–2006), Norwegian judge and politician
 Astri Taube (1898–1980), Swedish sculptor and artist